The contubernium (Latin: “tenting-together”) was the smallest organized unit of soldiers in the Roman Army and was composed of eight legionaries, essentially the equivalent of a modern squad, although unlike modern squads contubernia seemed to serve no tactical role in battle. The men within the contubernium were known as contubernales. Ten contubernia, each led by a decanus, were grouped into a centuria of 100 men (eighty legionaries plus twenty support staff), which was commanded by a centurion. 
Soldiers of a contubernium shared a tent, and could be rewarded or punished together as a unit. See Decimation (punishment)

Organization
The contubernium  was, at least very late in the period (though it is possible the title existed in the late Republic and early Principate), led by a decanus, who might be considered roughly as the equivalent of a junior non-commissioned officer.  However, there is no evidence of a decanus exercising any kind of battlefield command role, regardless of any responsibilities they may have had in garrison or camp. They were presumably appointed from within the contubernium and were most likely the longest-serving legionary. Their duties would likely have included organising the erection of the marching tent and ensuring their tent-mates kept things tidy.

Two auxiliary “servants”, roughly equivalent to modern logistical support troops, were assigned to each contubernium. They were responsible for the care of the contubernium's pack mule, making sure that the legionaries had water during the march, and may have had special skills like blacksmithing or carpentry.  However, legionaries often fulfilled specialist roles themselves, so it is quite possible that the support personnel were simply grooms and servants.

References

External links
Contubernales, A Dictionary of Greek and Roman Antiquities .

Infantry units and formations of ancient Rome
Roman legions